The Conservative government of the United Kingdom of Great Britain and Ireland that began in 1828 and ended in 1830 was led by the Duke of Wellington in the House of Lords and Robert Peel in the House of Commons.

History

Formation
The Duke of Wellington finally came to power after the abortive attempt at a Canningite-Whig coalition government came to an end with Viscount Goderich's resignation in January 1828. The government included several men from the previous administration, but four of the most important, Lords Dudley and Palmerston and Messrs Huskisson and Grant, resigned in May 1828.

Fate

The Duke oversaw the introduction of Catholic Emancipation, but remained resolutely opposed to parliamentary reform, and as a result lost a vote of no confidence on 15 November 1830. The Whigs under Lord Grey then formed the government which was to pass the Great Reform Act.

Cabinet

January 1828 – November 1830

Full list of ministers
Members of the Cabinet are indicated by bold face.

Notes

References
 
 Chris Cook and John Stevenson, British Historical Facts 1760–1830
 Joseph Haydn and Horace Ockerby, The Book of Dignities

British ministries
1820s in the United Kingdom
1828 establishments in the United Kingdom
1830 disestablishments in the United Kingdom
1830s in the United Kingdom
Ministry 1
Ministries of George IV of the United Kingdom
Cabinets established in 1828
Cabinets disestablished in 1830